Thomas J. Paolino is a member of the Rhode Island State Senate representing the 17th District (Lincoln, North Providence, North Smithfield). Paolino was first elected in 2016 following the retirement of Edward O'Neill.

Rhode Island State Senate and Political Career 
Paolino has served three terms in the Rhode Island State Senate and was most recently reelected in November 2022, beating independent and former State Senator and State Representative Jack Lyle, Jr., and progressive Democrat activist Cameron Deutsch by nearly 2,200 votes. In 2021, Paolino ran as the Republican candidate in a special election for Lincoln Town Administrator to fill a vacancy caused by the departure of T. Joseph Almond who resigned to take a job with the McKee administration. Paolino placed a distant second in a six-way race to independent and Lincoln Police Captain Philip Gould. Gould garnered 63% of the vote.

The Rhode Island Board of Elections conducted a review of Senator Paolino’s campaign finance reports from January 1, 2021, to March 31, 2022. The review found a number of campaign finance violations, including ten unreported campaign expenditures totaling to $1,369.37 and $10,000.00 in an unreported loan repayment. Additionally, account certifications were not submitted for six required campaign finance reports filed in 2021. Paolino admitted wrongdoing and acknowledged that he violated campaign finance laws, and agreed to pay a $2,500.00 fine from personal funds.

Electoral history 

2022 Rhode Island elections

2021 Lincoln Town Administrator special election

2020 Rhode Island elections

2018 Rhode Island elections

2016 Rhode Island Elections

References 

Living people
21st-century American politicians
Republican Party Rhode Island state senators
Dean College alumni
Year of birth missing (living people)
Place of birth missing (living people)